EchoStar VII is an American geostationary communications satellite which is operated by EchoStar. It is positioned in geostationary orbit at a longitude of 119° West, from where it is used to provide high-definition television direct broadcasting services to the United States.

EchoStar VII was built by Lockheed Martin Space Systems, and is based on the A2100 satellite bus. The launch occurred from Launch Complex 36 at the Cape Canaveral Air Force Station in Florida, on 21 February 2002.

See also

2002 in spaceflight

References

Spacecraft launched in 2002
Satellites using the A2100 bus
Communications satellites in geostationary orbit
Spacecraft launched by Atlas rockets
E07